The 2009 Donington Superbike World Championship round was the ninth round of the 2009 Superbike World Championship season. It took place on the weekend of 26–28 June 2009 at Donington Park.

Results

Superbike race 1

Superbike race 2

Supersport race

References
 Superbike Race 1
 Superbike Race 2
 Supersport Race

Donington Round
Donington